Razorfish, a part of Publicis Groupe, is an interactive agency. Razorfish provides services including web development, media planning and buying, technology and innovation, emerging media, analytics, mobile, advertising, creative, social influence marketing and search.

Razorfish had more than 2,000 employees worldwide, with U.S. offices in New York, Chicago, Boston, Seattle, San Francisco, Philadelphia, Portland, Los Angeles, Atlanta, and Austin. In 2005–2007, it expanded overseas through acquisitions in London, Paris, Sydney, Hong Kong, Shanghai, Beijing, Berlin, Frankfurt, Singapore and a joint venture in Tokyo. In 2013, Razorfish launched its operations in India through the acquisition of Neev Technologies. Razorfish Neev was based in Bangalore and provides outsourced product and application development solutions.

In October 2016, Razorfish merged with Sapient Corporation's division SapientNitro (a Publicis Groupe sister company) to form SapientRazorfish.

In July 2018, Publicis announced plans to sunset the SapientRazorfish brand and roll the remaining employees under the Publicis.Sapient organization.

On February 13, 2019, Publicis announced that Publicis.Sapient, SapientRazorfish, and Sapient Consulting had become one brand, Publicis Sapient, led by CEO Nigel Vaz.

On January 14, 2020, Jem Ripley, Publicis Communications East CEO, confirmed that Publicis is bringing back the Razorfish name for its digital marketing agency, consisting of clients that didn't fit into Publicis Sapient's digital transformation strategy.

History

Beginnings
Razorfish was founded in New York in 1994 by Craig Kanarick and Jeff Dachis and was originally headquartered at Dachis's apartment in Manhattan's Alphabet City. Their first major project was a $20,000 assignment to create a small website for the New York Botanical Society, commissioned by Time Warner's Pathfinder business unit. A few months later, they moved into an office at 580 Broadway and hired three new employees.

Early success
The company generated over $300,000 in revenue in 1995 and over $1.2m in 1996, with a $300k EBITDA profit.

They were one of the first companies to have an animated homepage, utilizing the "server-push" capabilities of the latest version of the Netscape browser. Because of this and aggressive marketing tactics the firm grew quickly over the next few years. Soon thereafter, they received a strategic investment from Omnicom (along with other New Media pioneers, Agency.com, Red Sky Interactive, Think New Ideas and Organic), making them one of the first firms to be financed by a traditional media holding company. Razorfish used this money to move to new offices, redesign their branding (to include the slogan "Everything that can be digital will be.") and expand operations. Razorfish, along with other New York-based Web design companies, formed the core of a cluster of New Media companies known as Silicon Alley.

In 1997, the company generated over $3.6 million in revenues, with a healthy portfolio of prestigious clients like KPMG and Charles Schwab.

In January 1998, Razorfish made its first of what was to be many acquisitions, by purchasing Avalanche Systems. In 1998, Razorfish also acquired Plastic in San Francisco, London-based CHBi, Los Angeles-based <tag> media, and then merged with Scandinavian interactive leader, Spray, which had offices in Sweden, Finland, Norway and Germany.

The company generated over $83 million in revenue in 1998 and was profitable, putting it on solid ground for an IPO. The company had over 1,100 employees at the time.

In April 1999, the company had an IPO which raised $48 million at $16 per share.

In fall 1999, Razorfish acquired International Integration, Inc. (I-Cube), a Boston-based company founded by Yannis Doganis, Madhav Anand, and Edouard (Eddie) Aslanian, its largest deal to date. The company's sales for 1999 topped $170 million.

In May 2000, Razorfish announced the launch of Intervision-Razorfish, a joint venture based in Tokyo. Around the same time, as the entire industry started to feel the effects of the dot-com bubble, Razorfish saw Q4 revenues of $50.1m, a 5% drop from the year before. Total revenues for 2000 were almost $268 million. In February 2001, Razorfish laid off 400 employees, roughly 20 percent of its staff, with its stock price decreasing from a $57 high in February 2000 to just $1 per share.

60 Minutes II interview

In February 2000, Craig Kanarick and Jeff Dachis were interviewed by Bob Simon on 60 Minutes II, where they appeared unable to answer the question, "What do you do?".

The interview was widely viewed as a complete disaster.

Acquisition by SBI
Razorfish was taken private by SBI Group (formerly SBI and Company) in 2003 and was renamed to SBI.Razorfish. SBI also purchased other assets from "The Fast Five," including Scient, iXL, MarchFirst (formerly USWeb and CKS Group), Emerald Solutions, Lante, and Xcelerate.

Acquisition by aQuantive
The company was renamed again, this time as Avenue A | Razorfish when the SBI.Razorfish division of the SBI Group (formerly SBI and Company) was acquired by aQuantive in 2004.

The Avenue A | Razorfish combination in 2004 resulted in an interactive agency that according to Ad Age had the highest interactive revenue in the US in 2005, at $189.8 million.

Acquisition by Microsoft
Microsoft announced on May 18, 2007 its intention to acquire Avenue A | Razorfish as part of a $6.0 billion cash purchase of parent company aQuantive. The transaction closed on August 10, 2007. Razorfish continued to function as an independent company as part of Microsoft Advertising, run by Brian McAndrews, formerly CEO of aQuantive, who reported directly to the president of Microsoft's Platforms & Services Division. On October 20, 2008, the company decided to be known as Razorfish, dropping the Avenue A brand.

In June 2009, it was reported that Microsoft had put the company up for sale.

Acquisition by Publicis Groupe
Microsoft had earlier in June 2009 notified the markets of its intention to sell Razorfish, which many believed conflicted with Microsoft Advertising's main operations that sell advertising technology services to rival agencies. On August 9, Paris-based holding company Publicis Groupe agreed to acquire Razorfish from Microsoft for US$530 million in cash and shares, which in turn gave Microsoft a 3% equity stake in Publicis Groupe.
 Clark Kokich had served as CEO of the company since July 2007; however, in April 2008, Bob Lord was named the new CEO, while Kokich took on the newly formed role of Chairman. In July 2013, Pete Stein was promoted to the role of Global CEO. Stein had been part of the executive leadership team for five years. Pete was succeeded as the CEO by Tom Adamski and then by Shannon Denton. In October 2015,  Tom Adamski died of cancer.

In 2016, Razorfish merged with SapientNitro to form SapientRazorfish, led by former SapientNitro CEO Alan Wexler, who also became Co-CEO of Publicis.Sapient with and Sapient Consulting CEO Chip Register.

Global offices
 North America
 United States: Razorfish
 Canada: Razorfish

 Europe
 Germany: Razorfish
 UK: Razorfish
 France: Razorfish

 Asia-Pacific
 Australia: Razorfish
 China: Razorfish
 Hong Kong: Razorfish
 India: Razorfish Neev
 Singapore: Razorfish

 Latin America
 Brazil: Razorfish

Awards and recognition

1998
In April 1998, the Razorfish Subnetwork, designed by Razorfish, was added to the permanent collection of the San Francisco Museum of Modern Art.

2008
In 2008, Razorfish won over 75 creative awards including 10 Webbys, 11 Interactive Media Awards, 16 WebAwards, 3 OMMAs, 2 ADDYs, and 3 Create Awards. The Nike “Sweet Spots” campaign produced by Duke, a Razorfish Company (located in France), was recognized on the 2008 Cannes Cyber Lions shortlist. Also, Razorfish's Chief Strategy Officer Jeff Lanctot, was named for the second consecutive year to the Mediaweek 50, a list of the country's top media executives. Forrester Research cited the company as a leader in “The Forrester Wave: Interactive Marketing Agencies” report published in December 2007. Ad Age named (then) Avenue A | Razorfish 2005 media agency of the year. Forrester Research ranked it as a top-tier web design agency in its 2006 Web Design Agency Shootout. Its work for Mercedes-AMG won the 2006 Webby Award for Best Automotive Site, and its redesign of NYTimes.com garnered a 2007 Webby for Best Newspaper Site.

2012
Ad Age placed Razorfish at number 4 on their annual Agency A-List.  Also in 2012, Razorfish won the One Show Entertainment Gold pencil for Innovation in Branded Content for client Axe.

2013
In 2013, Razorfish was again recognized by Ad Age, placing number 9 on their annual Agency A-List.

References

1995 establishments in New York City
Advertising agencies based in New York City
American companies established in 1995
Marketing companies established in 1995
Digital marketing companies of the United States
Publicis Groupe
2003 mergers and acquisitions
2009 mergers and acquisitions
1999 initial public offerings
American subsidiaries of foreign companies